The Samsung SGH-E250i mobile was introduced in 2008 as a dual band (900 and 1800 MHz) variant version of the tri band (900, 1800 and 1900 MHz) Samsung SGH-E250.

The official Samsung India site declares that the E250i is an "E250 relaunched with superior features" such as background music and advanced mobile tracker.

The E250i has the same design as the E250 and very similar features like GPRS, EDGE, VGA camera, 2.0" display, Bluetooth, MP3 player and FM radio with recording. Another difference between E250i and E250 is that E250i has an 800 mAh battery instead of E250's 750 mAh.

The maximum SAR value of the Samsung SGH-E250i is 0,951 W/Kg

Features
Design: 
 Slider
 Weight: 80.8g
 Dimensions (mm): 99.5 × 49.5 × 14.1

Platform: 
 Network & Data: GSM/GPRS
 Band: 900/1800 MHz
 CPU: ARM9 (230 MHz)
 Operation System: Proprietary
 Java: Yes

Display:
 Technology: 65k QQVGA
 Resolution: 128×160/176×144
 Size (inch): 2.0

Battery:
 Type: AB463446BU
 Capacity: 800 mAh
 Talk Time: up to 10 hours
 Standby: up to 243 hours

User interface:
 Keyboard

Camera:
 Resolution: VGA
 Zoom: digital 4X
 Shot Mode
 Photo Effects

Video:
 Video player
 Video recording
 Video messaging (MMS)

Music and sound:
 Ringtones: 64 Polytone
 Music Player
 Voice recording
 MP3 Ringtones
 Music Library

Fun and entertainment:
 Embedded JAVA games
 Embedded
 FM Radio

Business and office:
 Document Viewer
 Offline Mode
 Voice Memo & Voice Mail

Messaging:
 SMS / MMS
 Predictive Text Input T9
 Email
 Cell Broadcast
 vCard / vCalendar

Connectivity:
 Bluetooth
 WAP
 SyncML(DS)
 USB
 PC Sync Application
 Internet HTML Browser

Memory:
 User Memory: 14 MB
 Expandable memory: MicroSD (up to 2 GB)
 Scheduler
 Clock
 Calendar
 Alarm
 Calculator
 Stopwatch
 Countdown Timer

Call functions:
 Speakerphone
 Dialed / Missed / Received Calls memory
 Multy Party
 Caller ID
 Call Time

Notes

External links
 Samsung SGH-E250i official site (Germany)
 Samsung SGH-E250i official site (Middle East) 
 Samsung SGH-E250i user manual (english)

E250i
Mobile phones introduced in 2008